Concordia High School may refer to:
 Concordia Academy (Austin, Texas)
 Concordia Junior-Senior High School (Kansas)
 Concordia High School (Concordia, Missouri)
 Concordia High School (Edmonton)
 Concordia Lutheran High School (Fort Wayne, Indiana)
 Concordia Lutheran High School (Texas)

See also
 
 Concordia (disambiguation)
 Concordia Academy (disambiguation)
 Concordia University (disambiguation)
 Cloud County Community College in Concordia, Kansas, U.S.
 Concordia Language Villages
 Concordia Normal School (closed 1878)
 Concordian International School, in Bangkaew, Samutprakarn, Thailand
 Great Western Business and Normal College, or Concordia Normal School and Business College, Concordia Business College, in Concordia, Kansas, U.S. (closed 1930s)